The Wyoming Valley School is a historic school building designed by architect Frank Lloyd Wright in the town of Wyoming in Iowa County, Wisconsin, United States. It is listed on the National Register of Historic Places.



History
In 1956, the Wyoming school board elected to consolidate its individual schools into one building. As Frank Lloyd Wright's home, Taliesin, was several miles/km away from the proposed site, the school board approached the architect to design their new school building. Wright enthusiastically agreed to do so and donated significant funds to its construction. He would dedicate the assembly room to his mother and her sisters, all of whom were schoolteachers.

The building is a one-story elongated hexagon, with two classrooms on the south side of the building. The Great Room on the north side has a fireplace with a raised area. The Great Room and classrooms have a clerestory. The north side of the building includes two smaller rooms on the east and west sides that contain the kitchen and teacher's lounge, with bathrooms. 

The structure has since been converted into a cultural center. It was added to the state and the National Register of Historic Places in 2016.

See also

 National Register of Historic Places listings in Iowa County, Wisconsin
 Storrer, William Allin. The Frank Lloyd Wright Companion. University Of Chicago Press, 2006,  (S.401)

References

External links

 Wyoming Valley School website
 Exterior photographs of the Wyoming Valley Grammar School
 Interior photographs of the Wyoming Valley Grammar School

School buildings on the National Register of Historic Places in Wisconsin
National Register of Historic Places in Iowa County, Wisconsin
Frank Lloyd Wright buildings
Public elementary schools in Wisconsin
Schools in Iowa County, Wisconsin
Defunct schools in Wisconsin
Cultural centers in the United States
Modern Movement architecture in the United States
School buildings completed in 1957